KSDS (88.3 FM, "Jazz 88.3") is a full-time mainstream/traditional Jazz radio station, licensed to the San Diego Community College District, broadcasting 24 hours a day from the campus of San Diego City College. The station is owned by City College, although their transmitter and antenna are located near their partner college, Mesa College, located north of City College, in Kearny Mesa.

KSDS, founded in 1951, began programming jazz in 1973 and in 1985 became San Diego's only full-time jazz and blues station.  KSDS is licensed by the FCC as a non-commercial, non-profit educational radio station and, for many years, operated with 3,000 watts at 88.3 MHz FM. In 2007, KSDS was granted a Construction Permit by the Federal Communications Commission allowing the station to increase its power to 22,000 watts, greatly improving the signal coverage area.  They also feature a live stream and a playlist archive at their website.

They play music from artists like John Coltrane, Miles Davis, Dizzy Gillespie, Duke Ellington, Ella Fitzgerald, and Jelly Roll Morton to Rob McConnell, Bobby Watson, Herbie Hancock, and Wynton Marsalis.

KSDS/Jazz88 features specialty programs that concentrate on various subgenres of the music, such as Dixieland, Latin jazz, swing, big band, free jazz, world music, vocalists, all-female artists, and exclusively guitar music.

KSDS has two HD Radio channels. KSDS-HD1 simulcasts the analog stereo channel. KSDS-HD2 carries "Student Designed Sound", with both spoken word and music programs produced by students in City College's broadcasting program.

See also
 List of jazz radio stations in the United States

References

External links
 KSDS official website
 

Jazz radio stations in the United States
NPR member stations
Radio stations established in 1951
SDS
HD Radio stations
1951 establishments in California